Hereford Moorfields railway station was a station in Hereford, Herefordshire, England. The station was opened in 1863 and closed in 1874. The station handled goods traffic from 1874 until 1979 and the Bulmer Railway Centre operated on the site from 1968 to the 1990s.

References

Sources

Disused railway stations in Herefordshire
Railway stations in Great Britain opened in 1863
Railway stations in Great Britain closed in 1874
Former Midland Railway stations